Alexis Paul Arapoff (né Alexei Pavlovich Arapov; ;  6 December 1904 – 25 September 1948) was a White émigré Russian-born painter, first based in France in 1923, where he belonged to the École de Paris, and later in Boston, Massachusetts, where he relocated in 1930.

Biography
Born the only son of an Orthodox noble family (Arapov) in Saint Peterburg, Russia, Alexis flew to Germany in 1917 to escape the revolution. When he came back to Russia in 1921, he was admitted to the Saratov Art Institute. In 1923, he went to Moscow, where he became a furniture designer in a workers' palace. Following this, he created suits and scenes for the "avant-garde" theater of Russian choreographer Nikolai Foregger. Later he worked for the "False Mirror Theatre" of Nikolai Evreinov, and followed the theater trip to Paris in 1925.

He remained in Paris where he met Catherine Green, an American studying at the Sorbonne. They married and moved to the United States in 1930. Arapoff, a Roman Catholic convert since 1934, painted religious paintings and icons. He became a U.S. citizen in 1937.

In 1948, Arapoff died at the Henry Heywood Hospital in Gardner, Massachusetts, after a car accident in nearby Ashburnham. He was survived by his wife, their three daughters, Anne, Catherine and Mary, and three sons Peter, John and Paul. He was buried  at Holy Cross Cemetery in Malden.

Exhibitions
 1928, Arapoff had exhibitions at Paris's "Salon des Indépendants" and at "Salon des Tuileries"
 1935, Solo exhibition at the Grace Horne Gallery (Boston) 
 1938, at the New England Conservatory of Music and at "The Arts" (Boston)
 Art Institute of Chicago
 "Religious Works of Alexis Arapoff" Boston Library (Winter, 2002)

Cross station
The Boston Public Library possessed six paintings of a "Cross station". These paintings were considered lost in the 1980s.

References

1904 births
1948 deaths
Painters from Saint Petersburg
People from Sankt-Peterburgsky Uyezd
Nobility from the Russian Empire
Converts to Roman Catholicism from Eastern Orthodoxy
Former Russian Orthodox Christians
American Roman Catholics
Modern painters
20th-century Russian painters
Painters from the Russian Empire
White Russian emigrants to France
French emigrants to the United States
Federal Art Project artists
20th-century American painters
American male painters
Russian Roman Catholics
White Russian emigrants to the United States
Artists from Boston
20th-century American male artists
Road incident deaths in Massachusetts